The Old Beauty and Others is a collection of short stories by Willa Cather, published in 1948 after her death.

Contents
This collection contains the following stories:
 The Old Beauty
 The Best Years
 Before Breakfast

References

1948 short story collections
American short story collections
Short story collections by Willa Cather
Alfred A. Knopf books
Books published posthumously